Marbella Cup 2011 is an friendly football tournament held in Spain during the winter football break. The tournament takes place in Costa Del Sol. It mainly involves football teams from the Nordic and Eastern European countries. In tournament play 8-ht team's. The tournament is held in the period 2 to 8 February 2011.

Teams
  Polonia Warszawa
  FC Kuban
  PFC Lokomotiv Plovdiv
  Sparta Prague
  FC Zenit Saint Petersburg
  FC Zestafoni
  FC Timișoara
  FC Dnipro Dnipropetrovsk

Match

Winners
  (1)  FC Dnipro Dnipropetrovsk
 (2) Polonia Warszawa
 (3) Sparta Prague

External links
 Official Site
 BetExplorer
 ScoresPro
 Oddsportal 2011

2011
2010–11 in Polish football
2010 in Russian football
2010–11 in Bulgarian football
2010–11 in Czech football
2010–11 in Georgian football
2010–11 in Romanian football
2010–11 in Ukrainian football